Torbjørn Yggeseth (18 June 1934 – 10 January 2010) was a Norwegian ski jumper who was active in the 1960s. He competed for Heggedal Idretsslag.

Yggeseth won the ski jumping competition at the Holmenkollen ski festival in 1963, the same year he earned the Holmenkollen medal (shared with Alevtina Kolchina, Pavel Kolchin, and Astrid Sandvik). He also had two career victories. Competing in two Winter Olympics, he earned his best finish of fifth in the individual large hill event at Squaw Valley in 1960. After retiring from competitions, Yggeseth had been involved in administrative roles inside the FIS, including serving on its technical committee for ski jumping as chair from 1982 to 2004.

Yggeseth trained in the United States Air Force as a pilot.  He also created the Ski Jumping World Cup which first began in the 1979–80 season. He died of prostate cancer, aged 75.

References

External links

ABCnyheter 10 January 2010 announcement of Yggseth's death. – accessed 10 January 2010.

"Passing of Torbjørn Yggseth". (13 January 2010 FIS article accessed 13 January 2010.)
Holmenkollen medalists – click Holmenkollmedaljen for downloadable pdf file 
Holmenkollen winners since 1892 – click Vinnere for downloadable pdf file 

1934 births
2010 deaths
Deaths from cancer in Norway
Deaths from prostate cancer
Holmenkollen medalists
Holmenkollen Ski Festival winners
Norwegian male ski jumpers
Olympic ski jumpers of Norway
Ski jumpers at the 1960 Winter Olympics
Ski jumpers at the 1964 Winter Olympics